August von Finck may refer to:

 August von Finck, Sr., (1898–1980), German businessman
 August von Finck, Jr., (b. 1930), German businessman, son of the above
 August François von Finck, (born 1968), German businessman, son of the above